A thorn forest is a dense scrubland with vegetation characteristic of dry subtropical and warm temperate areas with a seasonal rainfall averaging .

Regions

Africa
Is present in the southwest of Africa with smaller areas in other places of Africa.
 Thornveld often referred to as "acacia thornveld"
 Madagascar spiny forests

North America
Thorn forests cover a large part of southwestern North America.
 Pinyon–juniper woodland in Utah and the Canyonlands region.

South America
In South America, the thorn forest is sometimes called Caatinga, and consists primarily of small, thorny trees that shed their leaves seasonally.

Caatinga is considered a xeric shrubland and thorn forest, but contains the ecoregion Caatinga Enclaves moist forests that is considered Tropical and subtropical dry broadleaf forests.

Asia
 Deccan thorn scrub forests in India and Sri Lanka. Deccan is included in the Indomalayan biorealm, on the deserts and xeric shrublands biome.
 Northwestern thorn scrub forests in India and Pakistan

Australia
Mulga forest in Australia.

Transition
Thorn forests blend into savanna woodlands as the rainfall increases and into deserts as the climate becomes drier.

See also 
Arid Forest Research Institute
List of desert and xeric shrubland ecoregions

References

 

Ecoregions
Forests